Mandale may refer to:
Mandale, North Carolina, in the United States
Mandale, Ohio, in the United States
Mandale, Thornaby in North Yorkshire, England